Sosefo Suve is a Wallisian politician and member of the Territorial Assembly of Wallis and Futuna. He was President of the Territorial Assembly from 2012 to 2013.

Suve was a schoolteacher. He was first elected to the Territorial Assembly at the 2012 Wallis and Futuna Territorial Assembly election. He was a candidate for Assembly President following the election, but was defeated by Vetelino Nau by 11 votes to 9.

In November 2012 he was elected as President of the Assembly, serving for four months until being replaced by Nivaleta Iloai. In December 2014 he was elected president of the Assembly's standing committee. He lost his seat at the 2017 election. 

In November 2015 he was appointed to the French Economic, Social and Environmental Council (CESE) by the Overseas Minister. His term on the CESE ended in March 2021.

References

Living people
Wallis and Futuna politicians
Presidents of the Territorial Assembly of Wallis and Futuna
Year of birth missing (living people)